Amantis saussurei is a species of praying mantis native to India.

References

saussurei
Mantodea of Asia
Insects of India
Insects described in 1897
Taxa named by Ignacio Bolívar